HK Kurbads is an ice hockey team based in Riga, Latvia. It is a member of the Latvian Hockey Higher League and also compete for the Latvian Cup, winning Latvian Hockey League in 2016–17 and 2017–18 season. The team played its home games at Vidzemes Ledus Halle in Ogre until 2017 when the new arena was built in Rumbula, Riga.

History
HK Kurbads was founded by Andis Pikans, Janis Siraks and Gints Zviedritis in 1996 as an amateur team and played in various amateur championships until 2013 when they joined the Latvian Hockey Higher League. The team started playing its home games at Ogre.

In their debut season, as several stronger players joined the team they won the regular season, yet lost in the play-off final to HK Prizma.

For the 2014-15 season, the team was joined by players like Rodrigo Laviņš and Aleksandrs Macijevskis and despite finishing only 3rd in the regular season, they reached the finals again, just to lose to HK Mogo in the series 2 to 4.

In 2016, the team reached the finals for the third time and this time lost to HK Liepāja in the series 3 to 4. That was the first time in history for a Latvian Hockey League final requiring all 7 games to decide the winner.
As for the 2015–16 Latvian Cup, which was resurrected, Kurbads managed to reach the finals, where they lost to HK Mogo.

In 2017, Kurbads reached the finals for the 4th time and this time, despite being down 0 to 3 games in the series, managed to come back and win against HK Mogo, therefore winning their first championship and qualifying for next season's IIHF Continental Cup. In the Latvian Cup, they reached the finals and lost to HK Mogo for the second time 2:3 OT.

In next season they debuted in IIHF Continental Cup by winning all 3 games in Group B at home, but falling short in next round by narrowly losing, in what was the deciding game, to the Sheffield Steelers with a score of 2–4 and thus finishing 3rd in group and failing to advance. In Latvian Cup they reached finals again, yet lost once again in a thrilling game to HK Mogo 2:3 OT. In 2018, despite finishing the regular season in 3rd place, they managed to sweep the finals against HK Zemgale/JLSS to win the league title for the second year in a row.

Rivalry with HK Mogo
As both teams being based in Riga and having frequently played against each other in several league and cup finals, it has started a small rivalry between the two, and therefore even the regular season meetings carry some increased significance to both teams.

Season by season results

Tournaments
2015–16 Latvian Cup – Lost to HK Mogo 3–4 in the final.
2016–17 Latvian Cup – Lost to HK Mogo 2–3 in the final.
2017–18 Latvian Cup – Lost to HK Mogo 2–3 OT in the final.
2017–18 IIHF Continental Cup – 3rd in Group D of the Third Round. Failed to advance.
2018–19 IIHF Continental Cup – 3rd in Group D of the Third Round. Failed to advance.

Players and personnel

Current roster
Season 2017/2018

Goalies 

 30  Uldis Calpa
 35  Nils Grinfogels
 31  Guntars Reiss

Defense 
 12  Toms Bluks (C)
 33  Aleksandrs Galkins 
 22  Mārtiņš Gipters
 44  Hārdijs Parādnieks
 77  Mārtiņš Porejs
 14  Jēkabs Rēdlihs
 5  Arturs Sorokins
 10  Renars Valters (A)

Forwards 
 8  Edgars Brancis
 47  Mārtiņš Cipulis
 94  Gatis Gricinskis
 18  Toms Hartmanis (A)
 38  Martins Lavrovs
 21  Arturs Logunovs
 91  Rihards Remins
 81  Deivids Sarkanis
 13  Jānis Sprukts
 6  Juris Štāls
 7  Jānis Straupe
 9  Dāvis Straupe
 95  Juris Upītis
 71  Toms Zeltiņš
 29  Mārcis Zembergs
 19  Sandis Zolmanis

Notable players
Guntis Galviņš (born 1986), Latvian ice-hockey player
Sergejs Pečura (born 1987), Latvian ice hockey player
Eliezer Sherbatov (born 1991), Canadian-Israeli ice hockey player

Head coaches
Aigars Razgals, 2013
Aigars Cipruss, 2014
Gints Bisenieks, 2014–2015
Pēteris Ostošovs, 2015–2016
Rodrigo Laviņš, 2016-2017
Pēteris Ostošovs, 2017
Aleksandrs Macijevskis, 2017-present

References

External links
kurbads.lv
facebook
eliteprospects

Ice hockey teams in Latvia
Ice hockey teams in Riga
Ice hockey clubs established in 1996
Latvian Hockey League teams